Zethrene is a polycyclic aromatic hydrocarbon consisting of two phenalene units fused together. According to Clar's rule, the two exterior naphthalene units are truly aromatic and the two central double bonds are not aromatic at all. For this reason the compound is of some interest to academic research. Zethrene has a deep-red color and it is light sensitive - complete decomposition under a sunlight lamp occurs within 12 hours. The melting point is 262 °C.

Synthesis
The compound was originally synthesized by Erich Clar in 1955 from acenaphthene in one method and from chrysene in another. Mitchell and Sondheimer prepared the compound from a benzannulated [10]annulene.

A sulfur extrusion method was reported by Kemp, Storie, and Tulloch. Wu et al. reported the synthesis of the compound in a coupling reaction / dimerization with in-situ desilylization.

A Heck variation was reported in 2013.

Derivatives are also known.

Structure
X-ray crystallography indicates that zethrene is a planar molecule. The bond lengths in the central part of the molecule are consistent with distinct single and double bonds rather than aromatic components.

References

Polycyclic aromatic hydrocarbons